François Sureau (born 19 September 1957) is a French writer, lawyer and technocrat. He was born in the 14th arrondissement of Paris and educated at the École nationale d'administration (ENA). He is a co-founder and co-director of the French Review of Economics. He is also the founding president of the Association Pierre Claver which assists refugees and displaced persons who have arrived in France. He is also a member of the editorial board of the journal Commentary.

Sureau has won a number of prizes for his literary works. These include La Corruption du siècle, winner of the Prix Colette in 1988; L'Infortune, winner of the Grand Prix du roman de l'Académie française in 1990; Le Sphinx de Darwin, winner of the Prix Goncourt de la Nouvelle in 1997; and Les Alexandrins which won the Prix Méditerranée in 2003.

On 15 October 2020, he was elected as a member of the Académie Française (seat 24).

Books
 La Corruption du siècle, 1988, Prix Colette
 L'Infortune, Grand Prix du roman de l'Académie française, 1990
 L'Aile de nos chimères, 1993
 Les hommes n'en sauront rien, 1995
 Le Sphinx de Darwin, 1997
 Lambert Pacha, 1998
 Les Alexandrins, Prix Méditerranée, 2003
 L'Indépendance à l'épreuve
 La Chanson de Passavant, 2005
 L'Obéissance, 2006
 Inigo. Portrait, 2010
 Sans Bruit Sans Trace, 2011
 Le Chemin des Morts, 2013
 Surs les Bords de Tout, 2016
 Je ne pense plus voyager. La mort de Charles de Foucauld, 2016

References

1957 births
Sciences Po alumni
École nationale d'administration alumni
Members of the Académie Française
20th-century French novelists
21st-century French novelists
French male novelists
Prix Goncourt de la nouvelle recipients
Writers from Paris
Members of the Conseil d'État (France)
Living people
20th-century French male writers
21st-century French male writers
Grand Prix du roman de l'Académie française winners